Article Six of the United States Constitution establishes the laws and treaties of the United States made in accordance with it as the supreme law of the land, forbids a religious test as a requirement for holding a governmental position, and holds the United States under the Constitution responsible for debts incurred by the United States under the Articles of Confederation.

Text

Clauses

Debts

The first clause of the Article provides that debts contracted prior to the adoption of the Constitution remain valid, as they were under the Articles of Confederation.

Supremacy

Clause two provides that the Constitution, federal laws made pursuant to it, and treaties made under its authority constitute the supreme law of the land. It provides that state courts are bound by the supreme law; in case of conflict between federal and state law, the federal law must be applied. Even state constitutions are subordinate to federal law.

The Supreme Court under John Marshall (the Marshall Court) was influential in construing the supremacy clause. It first ruled that it had the power to review the decisions of state courts allegedly in conflict with the supreme law, claims of "state sovereignty" notwithstanding. In Martin v. Hunter's Lessee (1816), the Supreme Court confronted the Chief Justice of Virginia, Spencer Roane, who had previously declared a Supreme Court decision unconstitutional and refused to permit the state courts to abide by it. The Court upheld the Judiciary Act, which permitted it to hear appeals from state courts, on the grounds that Congress had passed it under the supremacy clause.

The Supreme Court has also struck down attempts by states to control or direct the affairs of federal institutions. McCulloch v. Maryland (1819) was a significant case in this regard. The state of Maryland had levied a tax on banks not chartered by the state; the tax applied, state judges ruled, to the Bank of the United States chartered by Congress in 1816. Marshall wrote that "the States have no power, by taxation or otherwise, to retard, impede, burden, or in any manner control, the operations of the constitutional laws enacted by Congress to carry into execution the powers vested in the general government." United States property is wholly immune to state taxation, as are government activities and institutions. Congress may explicitly provide immunity from taxation in certain cases, for instance by immunizing a federal contractor. Federal employees, however, may not be immunized from taxes, as the tax would not in any way impede government activities.

Gibbons v. Ogden (1824) was another influential case involving the supremacy clause. The state of New York had granted Aaron Ogden a monopoly over the steamboat business in the Hudson River. The other party, Thomas Gibbons, had obtained a federal permit under the Coastal Licensing Act to perform the same task. The Supreme Court upheld the federal permit. John Marshall wrote, "The nullity of an act, inconsistent with the Constitution, is produced by the declaration, that the Constitution is the supreme law. The appropriate application of that part of the clause which confers the same supremacy on laws and treaties, is to such acts of the State legislatures as do not transcend their powers, but though enacted in the execution of acknowledged State powers, interfere with, or are contrary to the laws of Congress, made in pursuance of the Constitution, or some treaty made under the authority of the United States. In every such case, the act of Congress, or the treaty, is supreme; and the law of the State, though enacted in the exercise of powers not controverted, must yield to it."

Reid v. Covert (1957) ruled that no branch of the United States Government can have powers conferred upon it by treaty that have not been conferred by the United States Constitution.

Oaths

Federal and state legislators, executive officers and judges are, by the third clause of the article, bound by oath or affirmation to support the Constitution. Congress may determine the form of such an oath. In Ex parte Garland (1866), the Supreme Court held that a test oath would violate the Constitution, so it invalidated the law requiring the following oath:

The Supreme Court found that the law constituted an unconstitutional ex post facto law, for it retroactively punished the offenses mentioned in the oath by preventing those who committed them from taking office.

Congress may not require religious tests for an office under the United States. Thus, Congress may include the customary words "so help me God" in an oath, but an individual would be under no compulsion to utter them, as such a requirement would constitute a religious test.

The current oath administered is as follows:

During the 1960 presidential campaign, the issue of whether the nation would for the first time elect a Catholic to the highest office in the land raised the specter of an implicit, but no less effective, religious test. John F. Kennedy, in his Address to the Greater Houston Ministerial Association on 12 September 1960, addressed the question directly, saying,

References

Further reading 
Irons, Peter. (1999). A People's History of the Supreme Court. New York: Penguin.

External links 

Kilman, Johnny and George Costello (Eds). (2000). The Constitution of the United States of America: Analysis and Interpretation.
CRS Annotated Constitution: Article 6

 
6
Federalism in the United States